Judith Brenda Grinham  (born 5 March 1939), also known by her married name Judith Roe or also by her former married name  Judith Rowley, is an English former competitive swimmer who represented Great Britain in the Olympics and European championships, and competed for England in the Commonwealth Games.  Grinham is an Olympic gold medallist, Commonwealth and European champion, and former world record-holder. In 1956 and 1958 she was chosen as Great Britain's Sportswoman of the Year. In 1958 she became the first woman in any sport to hold/win Olympic, European and Commonwealth titles.

Early life
Grinham was born in the London suburb of Hampstead and grew up in Neasden. She studied at the Convent of Jesus & Mary, Harlesden, London NW10.

Personal life
She married Pat Rowley in Neasden in 1960, in St. Catherine's Church. They had two children, Keith (born in June 1961) and Alison (born in December 1962). In 1977 she divorced and remarried Michael Roe in 1979, (who had 4 children). She has five grandchildren and 5 step-grandchildren.

Career
Grinham competed in the 1956 Olympic Games in Melbourne, Australia, winning the 100-metre backstroke, setting a world record of 1:12.9. She became the first Briton to win an Olympic swimming gold since Lucy Morton in 1924.

Grinham competed in the 1958 British Empire and Commonwealth Games in Cardiff, Wales, and won the 100-metre backstroke in 1:11.9. She went on to win a second gold medal as a member of the winning British team in the 4×100-metre medley team at the 1958 European Championships in Budapest, Hungary, and won an individual gold in the 100-metre backstroke.  She became the first woman in any sport to hold Olympic, Commonwealth and European gold medals at the same time. She won the 1958 ASA National Championship 110 yards freestyle title, the 1957 ASA National Championship 220 yards freestyle title and the 110 yards backstroke title three times (1955, 1956, 1958).

Grinham retired from competitions in 1959. The same year she appeared as a P.T. instructor in the Associated British Technicolor wartime service comedy film Operation Bullshine, alongside stars Donald Sinden, Barbara Murray and Carole Lesley, but never made another film.

Grinham was inducted into the International Swimming Hall of Fame as an "Honour Swimmer" in 1981.

In 2007, she was appointed a Member of the Order of the British Empire (MBE) in the Queen's Birthday Honours list, 50 years after winning gold in Melbourne.

See also
 List of members of the International Swimming Hall of Fame
 Great Britain and Northern Ireland at the 1956 Summer Olympics
 List of Olympic medalists in swimming (women)
 World record progression 4 × 100 metres medley relay

References

1939 births
Olympic gold medallists for Great Britain
Olympic swimmers of Great Britain
Female backstroke swimmers
Swimmers at the 1956 Summer Olympics
English Olympic medallists
Commonwealth Games gold medallists for England
Commonwealth Games bronze medallists for England
Living people
World record setters in swimming
Members of the Order of the British Empire
English female freestyle swimmers
European Aquatics Championships medalists in swimming
English backstroke swimmers
Medalists at the 1956 Summer Olympics
Olympic gold medalists in swimming
Commonwealth Games medallists in swimming
Swimmers at the 1958 British Empire and Commonwealth Games
Medallists at the 1958 British Empire and Commonwealth Games